Frank Charles High (June 7, 1875 – December 13, 1966) was a United States Army soldier received the Medal of Honor for his actions during the Philippine–American War. High was one of thirteen members of Young's Scouts awarded the Medal of Honor for actions between May 13 and May 16, 1899.

High was born in Yolo County, California, where his family owned a ranch. He enlisted in the Army from Picard, California, and later arrived in Jacksonville, Oregon, from where he joined the 2nd Oregon Volunteers. During the Philippine–American War, he was a member of Young's Scouts. On May 16, 1899, Filipino fighters set fire to an important bridge near San Isidro. The river could not be forded, so High and other scouts rushed across the burning bridge, despite intense enemy fire, and engaged the entrenched Filipino forces. For these actions, High was awarded the Medal of Honor.

After returning home, High settled in Ashland, Oregon, where he lived until his death at age 91. He is buried at Memory Gardens Cemetery and Memorial Park in nearby Medford. High Street in Ashland is named in his honor.

Medal of Honor citation
Rank and Organization: Private, U.S. Army, Company G, 2d Oregon Volunteer Infantry. Place and Date: Near San Isidro, Philippine Islands, May 16, 1899. Entered Service At: Picard, California. Birth: Yolo County, California, Calif. Date of Issue: Unknown.

Citation:

With 21 other scouts charged across a burning bridge, under heavy fire, and completely routed 600 of the enemy who were entrenched in a strongly fortified position.

See also
List of Philippine–American War Medal of Honor recipients

References

1875 births
1966 deaths
United States Army Medal of Honor recipients
United States Army soldiers
People from Ashland, Oregon
People from Yolo County, California
People from Siskiyou County, California
Military personnel from California
American military personnel of the Philippine–American War
Philippine–American War recipients of the Medal of Honor